Yanqing railway station is the terminus of the Yanqing branch of the Line S2 of the Beijing Suburban Railway. Yanqing railway station was used as a freight station since 1983, and in 2003 it closed due to the fall of shipments. In 2008, the station finished its first renovation and resumed passenger services. From 2019, a new station hall began construction for the coming Winter Olympics.  Since 1 December 2020, The new station hall as well as Yanqing branch of Beijing–Zhangjiakou intercity railway begin serve the station.

Design
Yanqing railway station has been expanded for several major events hosted by Yanqing District. An upgrade of the bus transportation hub has been conducted for the Expo 2019 Horticultural Exhibition and the 2022 Winter Olympic Games, whose alpine events will be hosted in Yanqing District. The design of the facade image is inspired by both the local landscape, and Alpine skiing represented in the use of metal roof. The overall design scheme is defined as lofty mountains and flowing water, metaphos to the Yanqing welcomes the guests from all over the world. In the decoration design, the main elements are the Winter Olympics, the Great Wall and Yanqing local culture. The highly representative cultural symbols in Yanqing such as Mountain Haituo, Badaling and Xiadu Bridge have been applied to the relievo in the exit hall and waiting hall.

Services and Structure
The station contains a concourse, an integrated service center, ticket vending machines,  a convenience store and two check-in gates. Outside the new station hall is Yanqing integrated transportation hub include a visitors service center, a bus terminus, charging stations, and parking lots for vehicles and sharing bicycles. In December 2020, 5 pairs of high-speed trains and 3 pairs of   trains serve here.

References

Railway stations in Beijing